Madani Avenue is an urban road situated in Dhaka. Its name came from G.A. Madani, who was chairman of Dhaka Improvement Trust in Pakistan period (currently RAJUK). The road starts from US Embassy in Baridhara is 100 feet wide. Its length is 7 kilometers.

A kart racing platform named Go Kart, United City, Chef's Table Courtside and United International University are situated in Madani Avenue.

The road widening project was undertaken on September 25, 2016. Under this project the road will be made six lanes and will be extended up to Balu River. In future, people can gain entry from Madani Avenue to Dhaka-Chittagong highway through Purbachal.
Future planned MRT Line 5 of Dhaka Metro Rail will have at least a station in Madani Avenue.

References

Streets in Dhaka